Ochai Young Agbaji (born April 20, 2000) is an American professional basketball player for the Utah Jazz of the National Basketball Association (NBA). As a senior at the University of Kansas, Agbaji was named a consensus first-team All-American and voted the Big 12 Player of the Year in 2022. He led the Jayhawks to a national championship and was named the Final Four Most Outstanding Player (MOP).

Agbaji was drafted as the 14th overall pick in the 2022 NBA draft by the Cleveland Cavaliers. However, he was traded to the Jazz in September before playing a regular-season game in Cleveland.

Early life
Agbaji was born in Milwaukee, Wisconsin, but grew up in Kansas City, Missouri. He grew up playing soccer, upon his father's encouragement, playing club soccer as well as Amateur Athletic Union (AAU) basketball from a young age. Agbaji stopped playing soccer as a sophomore at Oak Park High School in Kansas City, Missouri to focus on basketball. He grew nine inches between his freshman and junior years. In his basketball career at Oak Park, Agbaji did not receive offers from any Power Five college programs until his senior season. As a senior, he averaged 27.6 points and 8.6 rebounds per game for Oak Park and was named Kansas City Star All-Metro player of the year. Agbaji was considered a three-star recruit by 247Sports and Rivals. On February 8, 2018, he committed to play college basketball for Kansas over offers from Texas A&M and Wisconsin.

College career
Agbaji started his freshman season at the University of Kansas as a redshirt and was a member of the scout team. In early January 2019, his redshirt was lifted because Kansas needed depth after Udoka Azubuike suffered a season-ending injury and Silvio De Sousa faced eligibility issues. On January 29, Agbaji made his first career start, scoring 24 points, bringing in seven rebounds, and stealing the ball twice in a loss to Texas. In his next game, he recorded his first double-double in a win over Texas Tech. Agbaji was named Big 12 Conference Newcomer of the Week for the two performances. Agbaji averaged 8.5 points and 4.6 rebounds per game in 22 games, including 16 starts as a freshman.

On November 5, 2019, Agbaji made his sophomore season debut, scoring 15 points in a loss to fourth-ranked Duke at the Champions Classic. During the aforementioned sophomore season, Agbaji was named Honorable Mention All-Big 12. As a sophomore, Agbaji averaged 10 points and 4.2 rebounds per game and finished second on the team with 46 three-pointers. He averaged 14.1 points per game as a junior, shooting 42 percent from the field. On April 8, 2021, he declared for the 2021 NBA draft while maintaining his college eligibility.

Agbaji made his senior season debut on November 9, 2021, recording 29 points in an 87–74 win against Michigan State at the Champions Classic. On January 24, 2022, he scored a career-high 37 points in a 94–91 double overtime win over Texas Tech. At the close of the season, Agbaji was voted the Big 12 Player of the Year and was named a consensus first-team All-American. Kansas won the 2022 NCAA tournament, and he scored 12 points in the championship game and was named the tournament MOP. On April 24, Agbaji declared for the 2022 NBA draft.

Professional career

Utah Jazz (2022–present) 
Agbaji was selected with the 14th overall pick in the 2022 NBA draft by the Cleveland Cavaliers. On July 2, 2022, Agbaji signed his rookie scale contract with the Cavaliers.

On September 1, 2022, Agbaji was traded, alongside Collin Sexton, Lauri Markkanen, three first round picks, and two pick swaps, to the Utah Jazz in exchange for Donovan Mitchell. Agbaji had his NBA debut on October 19, playing one minute in a 123–102 win over the Denver Nuggets.

Career statistics

College

|-
| style="text-align:left;"| 2018–19
| style="text-align:left;"| Kansas
| 22 || 16 || 25.9 || .449 || .307 || .694 || 4.6 || .9 || .5 || .5 || 8.5
|-
| style="text-align:left;"| 2019–20
| style="text-align:left;"| Kansas
| 31 || 31 || 33.3 || .428 || .338 || .673 || 4.2 || 2.0 || 1.2 || .3 || 10.0
|-
| style="text-align:left;"| 2020–21
| style="text-align:left;"| Kansas
| 30 || 30 || 33.7 || .420 || .377 || .689 || 3.7 || 1.9 || 1.1 || .5 || 14.1
|- 
| style="text-align:left;"| 2021–22
| style="text-align:left;"| Kansas
| 39 || 39 || 35.1 || .475 || .409 || .743 || 5.1 || 1.6 || .9 || .6 || 18.8
|-class="sortbottom"
| style="text-align:center;" colspan="2"| Career
|| 122 || 116 || 31.9 || .443 || .357 || .699 || 4.4 || 1.6 || .9 || .4 || 12.8

Personal life
Agbaji's father, Olofu, moved from Nigeria to the U.S. when he was 17. Agbaji's mother, Erica, and his father both played basketball at the University of Wisconsin–Milwaukee. His older sister, Orie, played volleyball for Texas.

References

External links
Kansas Jayhawks bio

2000 births
Living people
21st-century African-American sportspeople
African-American basketball players
All-American college men's basketball players
American men's basketball players
American sportspeople of Nigerian descent
Basketball players from Milwaukee
Cleveland Cavaliers draft picks
Kansas Jayhawks men's basketball players
Salt Lake City Stars players
Shooting guards
Utah Jazz players